Porto Ferreira is a municipality in the state of São Paulo in Brazil. It is situated on the Mojiguaçu River at an altitude of 559 meters. The population is 56,504 (2020 est.) in an area of 244.9 km².

History
The valley where Porto Ferreira now lies used to be inhabited by Payaguá people. The settlement Porto Ferreira on the Mojiguaçu River was founded in the 1860s, at the place of a ferry. It was named Ferreira after the ferryman João Inácio Ferreira. The settlement grew because of its strategic location on the way to the coffee plantations in the region of Ribeirão Preto. Porto Ferreira was officially established on 9 February 1888, as a part of the municipality Descalvado. It was detached from Descalvado and attached to Pirassununga on 1 October 1892. It became an independent municipality on 29 July 1896.

Demography 
Data of the Census - 2010 
Total population: 58.797 
Urban: 56.901
Rural: 1.896
Male: 29.240
Female: 29.550 
Infant mortality up to 1 year (for a thousand): 12,76 
Life expectancy (years): 81,82 
Fertility rate (children per woman): 1,95 
Literacy rate: 96.34% 
Human Development Index (IDH-M): 0,812
IDH-M Income: 0,845
IDH-M Longevity: 0,850
IDH-M Education: 0,880 (Source: IPEA DATE)

Per capita income: U$$3879,56 (estimative of 2010) 
Urbanization rate: 96.61% 
Annual Population Growth rate: 1.86% 
Number of hospital beds: 45 (per thousand inhabitants - 0,73)

Population that has access: 
Water supply: 98.5%
Sewage: 97.6%
Garbage collection: 100%
Source: IBGE

Geography 
The highest point of the city is the High Mount, with 798 meters. The lowest point is the Island of the Ducks, with 545 meters. In the Railroad station the altitude is of 549.7 meters above sea level.

The municipality holds the  Porto Ferreira State Park, created in 1987.

Climate 
annual average 
Temperature: 23 °C annual total
Precipitation: 1300-1500 millimeters 
Predominant wind direction: Southeast

Topography 
The general city landscape is flat, with small hills, slightly sloping towards the basins of the Moji Guaçu river and its tributaries. To the north, is possible to see some mountains.

Ways of Communication 
The city is served by two state highways, Rodovia Anhangüera (SP 330), SP 215.
There are also the disused rails from the former state railway company, FEPASA.

Soil 
Four types of soil are found, thus distributed for the area of the city: Yellow Red Latosol (62 km ²), Purple Latosol (74 km ²), Hidromórfico (27 km ²) and Dark Red Latosol (77 km ²).

Hydrography 
 Mojiguaçu River
 River Santa Rosa
 Amaros stream

References

External links 
 Page of the city hall
 Page of the chamber
 News and Pictures of Porto Ferreira

Municipalities in São Paulo (state)